Strongylostoma is a genus of flatworms belonging to the family Typhloplanidae.

Species:

Strongylostoma caecum 
Strongylostoma cirratum 
Strongylostoma coecum 
Strongylostoma devleeschouweri 
Strongylostoma dicorymbum 
Strongylostoma elongatum 
Strongylostoma gonocephalum 
Strongylostoma levandovskii 
Strongylostoma radiatum 
Strongylostoma rosaceum 
Strongylostoma simplex

References

Platyhelminthes